Jon Gibson may refer to:

 Jon Gibson (minimalist musician) (1940–2020), American flautist, saxophonist, and composer
 Jon Gibson (Christian musician) (born 1962), American soul and gospel singer, and producer
 Jon M. Gibson (born 1982), American writer and director, and founder of iam8bit

See also
 Jonathan Gibson (disambiguation)
 John Gibson (disambiguation)